España 1936 (1937) is a Spanish short documentary film.

Production
The film was directed by Jean-Paul Le Chanois and produced and co-written by Luis Buñuel, about the early days of the Spanish Civil War. It contains much genuine newsreel footage. In 1937, Spanish newspaper El Sol said this of the film:

Although Buñuel made the film in association with the French Communist Party, the film lacks a lot of the overt biases common to political documentaries of this era. Buñuel chronicled this film in his typical style showcasing the inhumanity, death, and destruction of the Spanish Civil War rather than focusing solely on a political message supporting one side or the other. This notable style of Buñuel stands in contrast to other politically based documentaries of the time including Triumph of the Will, The Man with the Movie Camera, and Night Mail, among others.

See also
The Spanish Earth
Spain in Flames

Further reading
Cinema as Political Propaganda during the Spanish Civil War: España 1936 by Magí Crusells, University of Barcelona, December 2004. PDF download

Sources

External links 
 

Documentary films about the Spanish Civil War
1930s Spanish-language films
Spanish short films
Spanish black-and-white films
Films directed by Jean-Paul Le Chanois
Spanish documentary films
Black-and-white documentary films
1930s short documentary films
1937 documentary films
1937 films